Sophie Weißenberg (born 24 September 1997) is a German track and field athlete who competes in international elite competitions. She is a World U20 silver medalist in long jump and a European U23 silver medalist in heptathlon.

References

1997 births
Living people
People from Neubrandenburg
German female long jumpers
German heptathletes
Sportspeople from Mecklenburg-Western Pomerania
20th-century German women
21st-century German women